Ephraim Smith Williams (February 7, 1802 – July 20, 1890) was the seventh mayor of the Village (now City) of Flint, Michigan serving from 1861 to 1862.

Early life

In 1861 he was elected Mayor of the city of Flint.

He also operated as a land merchant.

Political life
He was elected as the seventh mayor of the City of Flint in 1861 serving a one-year term.

References

External links

Mayors of Flint, Michigan
1802 births
1890 deaths
People from Concord, Massachusetts
19th-century American politicians